Goulburn-Oberon Road is a New South Wales country road linking Goulburn near Hume Highway to Oberon. This name is not widely known to most drivers, as the entire allocation is still best known as by the names of its constituent parts: Taralga Road and Abercrombie Road. This article will deal with the entire length of the corridor for sake of completion, as well to avoid confusion between declarations.

Route
At its northern end, the road passes through imposing plantations of radiata pine trees that supply the timber complex of Oberon.

It is now fully sealed, having undergone extensive work between 2002 and 2008. In 2007 the Upper Lachlan Shire received a grant of $710,000 over 3 years from the New South Wales Government to cover one third of the cost of realigning and sealing that remaining section and will allocate $1,420,000 of council funds over those three years to complete the work. With the support of Oberon Council the work was completed in the first year.

In conjunction with O'Connell Road from Oberon to Bathurst, this scenic route provides a leisurely and surprisingly direct route between Bathurst and Goulburn. The descent into the Abercrombie River Gorge from the North is particularly scenic.

Wombeyan Caves Road, leading through the Wombeyan Caves reserve and on to Mittagong, starts at the locality of Richlands, around halfway between Goulburn and Oberon. Laggan-Taralga Road from Crookwell ends in the historic town of Taralga a little further south. Bannaby Road to the locality of Bannaby also starts in Taralga.

The road is allocated Tourist Route 13, from Goulburn to Richlands, and continues east along Wombeyan Caves Road.

History
The passing of the Main Roads Act of 1924 through the Parliament of New South Wales provided for the declaration of Main Roads, roads partially funded by the State government through the Main Roads Board (later the Department of Main Roads, and eventually Transport for NSW). Main Road No. 256 was declared along this road on 8 August 1928, from the intersection with Great Western Highway at Oberon and Taralga to the intersection with Hume Highway at Goulburn (and continuing northwards to Bathurst).

The passing of the Roads Act of 1993 updated road classifications and the way they could be declared within New South Wales. Under this act, Goulburn-Oberon Road today retains its declaration as Main Road 256, from Oberon to Goulburn.

It was, at one stage "seen as a future bypass of Sydney".

Towns, villages and localities, from south to north

Major intersections

See also

 Highways in Australia
 List of highways in New South Wales

References 

Highways in New South Wales
Oberon Council